Francis Fleming (by 1502 – 1558) was an English politician.

He was a Member (MP) of the Parliament of England for Lyme Regis in 1547 and Southampton in March 1553.

References

1558 deaths
Year of birth uncertain
English MPs 1547–1552
English MPs 1553 (Mary I)